Paul Bright (born April 15, 1965) is a film writer, director, and editor recognized for his predominantly gay-themed feature films.

Early life 
Bright was born in Albuquerque, NM.  In 1972, after his mother's death from cancer, his father remarried and moved the family to Los Angeles. He attended the Hamilton High School Musical Theater Program and studied under Don Bondi and Dr. Bill Teaford.  During his senior year of high school year, he also attended the Hollywood High Performing Arts Magnet.  Later, he studied musical theater at the Dorothy Chandler Pavilion in Los Angeles under Paul Gleason's direction, and took voice training from Nathan Lam and Rickie Wiener.

Career 

One Playwright, One Vision, One World. Paul Bright wrote/directed/produced eleven feature films. He began writing short plays as a little kid, and his first feature film script led to meetings at Disney Studios in his early 20s.

In high school, Bright was discovered by an agent at Cunningham, Escott, DiPene Talent Agency of Beverly Hills and was cast in numerous TV commercials, Divorce Court, Loni Anderson's failed TV show Easy Street, and Blake Edwards's comedy film Micki and Maude.

From 2002 to 2004, Bright was the artistic director of the Gaslight Repertory Theater Company south of Austin, Texas, where he produced 32 stage productions in three years.  He left the theater company in 2005 to film Angora Ranch.

His original film company name, Silly Bunny Pictures, was a joke between himself and Tim Jones. Later films were released by Paul Bright Films.

Educational Courses 

Paul Bright is a Udemy instructor with educational courses. These courses include Introduction to Film making, Writing screen plays, Directing your own independent movie, and distribution of your own feature film.

Filmography

Feature films

References

External links

1965 births
Living people
American film producers
American theatre directors
Writers from Albuquerque, New Mexico
Film directors from New Mexico
Screenwriters from New Mexico